Manaji Rao Gaekwad was the fifth Maharaja of Baroda State reigning from 1789 to 1793.

He was the fifth son of Damaji Rao Gaekwad. Before becoming Maharaja, he also served as a regent for Baroda State from 1779 to 1792 under Sayaji Rao I Gaekwad. After his death he was succeeded as Maharaja of Baroda by Govind Rao Gaekwad.

See also
Gaekwad dynasty

References

External links
 Official Website of the Gaekwads of Baroda

1751 births
1793 deaths
Maharajas of Vadodara
Hindu monarchs
Indian royalty
Indian military leaders